Down to the Bone is an acid jazz group led by British DJ Stuart Wade, who formed the band in 1996 with Chris Morgans (who has now left). The group is very popular in the UK, where it is "hailed as the kings of UK jazz groove." The band's music is a mix of funk and jazz.

As of 2014 there are two sets of Personnel for the band – a US band and a UK band.

The music
Stuart Wade, the band's leader, does not play any instruments. He hums into a dictaphone.

Personnel
US Band
Rufus Philpot – Bass and MD/band leader
Katisse Buckingham – Alto Sax, Flute
Dan Boissy - Tenor Saxophone
Chris Bautista/Gabriel Johnson – Trumpet
Dave Wood – Guitar
Louie Palmer – Drums
Quinn Johnson / Lao Tizer / Hans Zermuehlen - keyboards
UK Band
Tim Smart – Trombone /MD
Simon Allen – Sax
Ryan Jacob – Trumpet
Alex Bennett – Keys
Jo Phillpotts / Chris Dodd – Bass
Davide Giovannini – Drums
Joe “Bongo” Becket – percussion
Billy Adamson – Guitar

Discography
1997 From Manhattan to Staten: The Album
1999 The Urban Grooves: Album II, featuring organist Reuben Wilson
2000 Spread the Word: Album III
2002 Crazy Vibes and Things, featuring Hil St. Soul
2004 Cellar Funk, featuring vocalist Flora Purim and organist Brian Auger
2005 Spread Love Like Wildfire, featuring N'Dambi and flutist Jeremy Steig
2006 The Best of Down to the Bone (compilation)
2007 Supercharged, featuring vibraphonist Roy Ayers
2009 Future Boogie, featuring Hil St. Soul and Roy Ayers
2011 The Main Ingredients
2014 Dig It

References

External links
Official website
Official Facebook Page
Interview with Stuart Wade

British jazz ensembles
Smooth jazz ensembles
Acid jazz ensembles
Narada Productions artists